Callichroma cosmicum is a species of beetle in the family Cerambycidae. It was described by White in 1853. It is known from Honduras, Nicaragua, and Costa Rica.

References

Callichromatini
Beetles described in 1853